Milan Diamond Lazane Edwards (born 18 September 2003) is an English professional footballer who plays as a midfielder for Southampton.

Career
Edwards joined Southampton from Reading in 2019. He signed his first professional contract in December 2020.

Career statistics

References

2003 births
Living people
English footballers
Association football midfielders
Reading F.C. players
Southampton F.C. players